The 2023 Mississippi State Senate election is scheduled to be held on Tuesday, November 7, 2023, to elect all 52 members of the Mississippi State Senate to four-year terms. It will be held concurrently with elections for all statewide offices and the Mississippi House of Representatives. Primary elections will take place on August 8.

Background 
In the 2019 Mississippi Legislature elections, Republicans expanded their majorities in both chambers to 75 in the House and 36 in the Senate. Going into the 2023 elections, Republicans held a two-thirds supermajority in the Senate, though not in the House.

The 2023 election will be the first election held under new district maps following redistricting as a result of the 2020 Census.

Overview

Results by district

See also 
 2023 United States state legislative elections
 2023 Mississippi House of Representatives election

References 

Mississippi State Senate
State Senate